Anaene improspersa is a moth of the subfamily Arctiinae. It was described by Harrison Gray Dyar Jr. in 1914. It is found in Panama.

References

Moths described in 1914
Lithosiini
Moths of Central America